Arthur Coulin (20 September 1869 – 9 November 1912) was an Austro-Hungarian Romanian painter and art critic.

Biography 
He was born in Nagyszeben, Austria-Hungary (now Sibiu, Romania) to an illustrious family of French origin. His father, Nikolaus, was a prominent lawyer who died when Arthur was only eleven. After that, his mother raised the family at the home of her father, a local judge. Arthur and his three siblings all dabbled in art and showed talent at an early age, but he was the only one who chose it as a career, against his mother's wishes.

After graduating, in 1888, he participated in a local exhibition, then entered the "School of Arts and Crafts" in Graz. The following year, he transferred to the Academy of Fine Arts, Munich where his primary professor was Gabriel von Hackl. Later, he studied with Ludwig von Löfftz, but had to return to Sibiu in 1891 for lack of funds.

In 1892, he moved to Budapest, where he found work in a photography studio. He also met the violinist Olga Fogarascher (1875–1959), whom he would marry in 1897. A new grant from the government came in 1900, enabling him to travel to Italy and work at the colony in Cervara di Roma. After returning, he settled in Brașov to work with Friedrich Miess. In 1904, he and Octavian Smigelschi collaborated in creating murals for  the Holy Trinity Cathedral in Sibiu. Three years later, he became a major contributor to a new cultural magazine, Die Karpathen.

Early in 1912, he underwent two surgeries for cancer. He attempted to continue travelling, exhibiting and completing his commissions, but died later that year in Heidelberg.

Selected paintings

References

Further reading 
 Exhibition Catalog (2010) Muzeul de Artă Brașov
 Harald Krasser, Arthur Coulin, Verlag Meridiane, 1970
 Gedächtnis-Ausstellung für Arthur Coulin (Memorial Exhibition), Sebastian Hann Association, Drotleff, 1913

External links 

1869 births
1912 deaths
19th-century Romanian painters
20th-century Romanian painters
19th-century Austrian painters
19th-century Austrian male artists
People from Sibiu
Portrait painters
Romanian art critics
Transylvanian Saxon people
Austrian people of French descent
Hungarian people of French descent
Romanian people of French descent
Romanian Austro-Hungarians
Deaths from cancer in Germany